811 or variation, may refer to:

In general
 811 (number), a number in the 800s range

Time
 811 AD, a year in the Common Era
 811 BC, a year Before the Common Era

Places
 Route 811, see List of highways numbered 811
 811 Nauheima, an asteroid in our Solar System, the 811th asteroid registered

Transportation
 Flight 811 (disambiguation)
 811 series, a Japanese electric multiple unit train class
 IAR 811, a Romanian training airplane

Other uses
 8-1-1, an N-1-1 telephone number in North America for non-urgent services

See also

 
 81 (disambiguation)